Kinetic is the third studio album by Joel Vaughn. Dream Records released it on April 22, 2016.

Critical reception

Awarding the album three and a half stars at Jesus Freak Hideout, Bert Gangl wrote, "Kinetic acquits itself with flying colors...this invigorating, albeit all-too-brief, effort will likely be an absolute revelation." Phronsie Howell, giving the album three and a half stars from New Release Today, writes, "Featuring solid vocals, upbeat music and encouraging lyrics, Kinetic sets the stage for Joel Vaughn to be a positive influence and welcome addition to the worship genre." Rating the album four stars, 365 Days of Inspiring Media, said, "In Kinetic, now that Joel Vaughn is signed, the production is cranked up a notch, with Joel’s passion for Jesus greater than ever." Paul Ewbank, indicating in a six out of ten review by Cross Rhythms, wrote, "Every line and beautifully crafted phrase on 'Kinetic' glows with a sincere love of singing God's praises."

Track listing

References

2016 albums
Centricity Music albums